RPM was a Canadian magazine that published the best-performing singles of Canada from 1964 to 2000. 1990 saw 21 songs reach the number-one spot in Canada. Phil Collins achieved the first number one of the year, "Another Day in Paradise", while Wilson Phillips stayed at number one into 1991 with "Impulsive". Nine different acts reached number one for the first time in 1990: The Wild Pair, Janet Jackson, Sinéad O'Connor, New Kids on the Block, Taylor Dayne, Mariah Carey, Wilson Phillips, Jon Bon Jovi without his band, and Alias—the only Canadian artist to reach number one during the year.

English singer Phil Collins was the most successful musician of 1990 in Canada, peaking at number one with four singles between January and October: "Another Day in Paradise", "I Wish It Would Rain Down", "Do You Remember?", and "Something Happened on the Way to Heaven"—all from his fourth album, ...But Seriously. "I Wish It Would Rain Down" remained at number one for six weeks in early spring, finishing 1990 as Canada's most successful single. Altogether, Collins spent 14 weeks at number one during the year, comprising more than a quarter of the calendar year.

Wilson Phillips was the only other act to reach number one with more than one song, rising to the top position with "Release Me" in September and "Impulsive" in December, totalling three weeks at number one. In May and June, Irish singer Sinéad O'Connor climbed to number one with "Nothing Compares 2 U" for five weeks while Mariah Carey and Alias stayed at number one for four weeks with "Vision of Love" and "More Than Words Can Say", respectively. Rod Stewart topped the chart for three weeks with "Downtown Train", as did Madonna with "Vogue".

Chart history

Notes

See also
1990 in music
List of Canadian number-one albums of 1990
List of Billboard Hot 100 number ones of 1990 (United States)
List of number-one singles from the 1990s (New Zealand)

References

External links
 RPM Magazine at the AV Trust
 RPM chart search at Library and Archives Canada

 
1990 record charts
1990